{{DISPLAYTITLE:C860H1353N227O255S9}}
The molecular formula C860H1353N227O255S9 (molar mass: 19240.898 g/mol) may refer to:

 Interferon alfacon-1
 Peginterferon alfa-2a

Molecular formulas